Randall Percival Weekes (born 1956) is a Canadian provincial politician. He is the Saskatchewan Party member of the Legislative Assembly of Saskatchewan for the constituency of Biggar-Sask Valley, after first being elected in 1999.

When the Saskatchewan Party won the 2007 election Weekes was appointed as the government whip. He served in several other positions throughout the 26th, 27th, and 28th legislatures, including a stint in cabinet from 2012 to 2014. Following the 2020 general election, Weekes was elected as Speaker of the Legislative Assembly of Saskatchewan.

Weekes has attended anti-abortion March for Life rallies in both Regina and Ottawa. In the 2018 Saskatchewan Party leadership election, Weekes supported Ken Cheveldayoff, who had stated that he doesn't believe rape victims should have legal access to abortion services, earning him the anti-abortion group Right Now's top rank out of the six leadership candidates.

Cabinet positions

References

Living people
Members of the Executive Council of Saskatchewan
Saskatchewan Party MLAs
1956 births
21st-century Canadian politicians